Lomatium ravenii is a species of flowering plant in the carrot family known by the common names Lassen parsley and Raven's lomatium. It is native to the Great Basin of the United States, where it grows in sagebrush and other plateau habitat, including areas with somewhat alkaline soils in Nevada, California, and other states.

Description
Lomatium ravenii is a hairy, gray-green perennial herb growing 5 to 40 centimeters long from a taproot and tuber unit. There is generally no stem, the leaves and inflorescence emerging at ground level. The leaf blades are divided into segments which are subdivided into smaller oval or knoblike segments. The inflorescence is a hairy umbel of white or purple-tinged flowers with dark anthers.

External links
Jepson Manual Treatment - Lomatium ravenii
USDA Plants Profile
Lomatium ravenii - Photo gallery

ravenii
Flora of the Great Basin
Flora of California
Flora of Nevada
Taxa named by Lincoln Constance
Taxa named by Mildred Esther Mathias
Flora without expected TNC conservation status